This is a list of the cities in Comoros, according to the region they are located in.

Anjouan

 Adda-Douéni
 Akibani
 Antsahé
 Assimpao
 Bada Kouni
 Bada la Djandza
 Bambao Mtrouni
 Bandajou
 Bandra Lamahalé
 Bandrani
 Bandrani-Mtangani
 Barakani
 Bazimini
 Bimbini
 Boungoueni
 Chandra
 Chaouéni
 Chironkamba
 Chiroroni
 Chitrouni
 Daji
 Dar-Salama
 Dindri
 Domoni
 Dziani
 Dzidri-I
 Dzindri
 Gnambo Mouro
 Gnatranga-Moiou
 Hachimpenda
 Hajoho
 Hamchako
 Harembo
 Jimilimé
 Jimlimi
 Kangani
 Koki
 Komoni
 Koni Ngani
 Koni-Djodjo
 Kowé-Cosini
 Limbi
 Lingoni
 Magnassini
 Magnassini-Nindri
 Maraharé
 Mbambao Mtsanga
 Mboigoma
 Milémbéni
 Mirongani
 Mirontsi
 Mjamaoue
 Mjimandra
 Moujimvia
 Moya
 Mramani
 Mrémani
 Mridjou
 Mromadji
 Mutsamudu (Island capital)
 Ndrodoni
 Ngandzalé
 Ongodjou
 Ongoni
 Ongoujou
 Ouani
 Ouzinii
 Patsy
 Pomoni
 Pomoni-Nindri
 Saandani
 Salamani
 Sima
 Tsimbeo
 Vassi
 Vouani

Grande Comore

 Bahani
 Bambadjani
 Bambani
 Bandamadji-Ladomba
 Bangoi-Hamtsaha-Madjeoué
 Bangoi-Mafousa Nkoa
 Batsa
 Boeni ya Bambao
 Boudadjou
 Bouni
 Chamlé
 Chezani
 Chindini
 Chouani
 Dembéni
 Dimadjou
 Dimadjou-Mdé
 Djomani-Mchenazi
 Djoumoichongo-Nyoumbadjou
 Domoni ya Djou
 Douniani
 Dzahadjou
 Dzahadjou Lamzandé
 Dzahani
 Dzoidjou
 Foumbouni
 Founga-Anihani
 Gnadombéni
 Hadjambou
 Hahaya-Aéroport
 Hambou
 Hantsambou
 Hantsindzi
 Héléindjé-Salimani-Zounda
 Heroumbili
 Hirohé
 Iconi
 Idjinkoundzi
 Ifoundihé Chamboini
 Itsandzéni
 Itsikoudi
 Itsinkoundi
 Ivémbéni-Bandasamoulini
 Ivoini
 Kandzilé-Mdjoihaya
 Koimbani
 Koua
 Madjéouéni
 Mandza
 Maouéni
 Maouéni-Ladjiri
 Mavingouni
 Mbachilé-Napabo
 Mbangoi-Koni-Mizidjou
 Mbéni
 Mdé-Sahani
 Mdjankagnoi
 Mdjouézi
 Mdjoyezi
 Mémboi-Djou
 Mitsamiouli
 Mitsoudjé
 Mitsoudjé-Troumbeni
 Mmnoungou
 Mohoro
 Moidja
 Moidzaza Mboini
 Moroni (National and island capital)
 Mtsamdou
 Mtsangadjou
 Mvouni
 Ndrouani
 Ndzaouzé
 Ngnoumadzaha Mvoubari
 Nioumamilima
 Nkourani
 Nouma Milima
 Noumadzaha
 Nroundé
 Ntsadjéni
 Ntsaouéni
 Ntsoralé
 Ntsoudjini
 Nyambéni
 Ouéllah-Tayfa
 Ouhozi
 Ounkazi
 Ourovéni
 Ousivo
 Ouzioini
 Panda
 Pidjani
 Salimani
 Salimani-Mdjiparé
 Samba-Kouni
 Samba-Mbondoni
 Séléa
 Seleani-Tsoralé
 Simamboini
 Simboussa
 Singani
 Tsidjé
 Tsinimoichongo
 Tsinimoipanga-Mihaboini
 Vanadjou
 Vanamboini
 Vouvouni
 Zivandani

Mohéli

 Bandar Salama
 Barakani
 Djoièzi
 Fomboni (Island capital)
 Hoani
 Kangani
 Mbatsé
 Miringoni
 Mtakoudja
 Ndrondroni
 Nioumachoua
 Ouallah
 Sambia
 Wanani
 Ziroudani

See also
 List of cities in East Africa

Comoros, List of cities in the
 
Cties
Comoros